The 1963–64 Yorkshire Football League was the 38th season in the history of the Yorkshire Football League, a football competition in England. At the end of the season Division Three was disbanded.

Division One

Division One featured 12 clubs which competed in the previous season, along with four new clubs, promoted from Division Two:
Hull Brunswick
Mexborough Town
Swillington Miners Welfare
Wombwell Sporting Association

League table

Map

Division Two

Division Two featured ten clubs which competed in the previous season, along with five new clubs.
Clubs relegated from Division One:
Goole Town reserves
Grimethorpe Miners Welfare
Hatfield Main
Yorkshire Amateur
Plus:
Kiveton Park, from the East Derbyshire League

Also, Brodsworth Main changed name to Brodsworth Miners Welfare.

League table

Map

Division Three

Division Three featured seven clubs which competed in the previous season, along with two new clubs:
Keighley Central
Slazengers

League table

Map

League Cup

Final

References

1963–64 in English football leagues
Yorkshire Football League